This is a list of Danish writers.

Olivia Levison
Naja Marie Aidt
Erik Amdrup
Hans Christian Andersen
Vilhelm Andersen
Herman Bang
Peter Bastian
Jens Bjerre
Sara Blaedel
Karen Blixen (Isak Dinesen)
Anders Bodelsen
Georg Brandes
Suzanne Brøgger
Inger Christensen
Stig Dalager
Tove Ditlevsen
Inge Eriksen
Bent Faurby 
Karl Gjellerup
Anna Grue
Meïr Aron Goldschmidt
Julius Villiam Gudmand-Høyer
Thorkild Hansen
Johan Ludvig Heiberg
Henrik Hertz
Peer Hultberg
Peter Høeg
Jens Peter Jacobsen
Johannes Vilhelm Jensen
Ellen Jørgensen (historian)
Christian Jungersen
Søren Kierkegaard
Eigil Knuth
Birgithe Kosovic
Tom Kristensen
Lars Kroijer
Svend Aage Madsen
Peter Nansen
Henri Nathansen
Martin Andersen Nexø
Robert Storm Petersen
Henrik Pontoppidan
Jytte Rex
Klaus Rifbjerg
Aksel Sandemose
Peter Seeberg
Tage Skou-Hansen
Jan Sonnergaard
Villy Sørensen
Pia Tafdrup
Harald Tandrup
Kirsten Thorup
Dan Turell
Gustav Wied

See also
 List of Danish poets
 Danish literature
 List of Danish women writers

 
Writers
Danish